The 2014 Sochi GP3 Series round was a GP3 Series motor race held on October 11 and 12, 2014 at Sochi Autodrom, Russia. It was the eighth round of the 2014 GP3 Series. The race supported the 2014 Russian Grand Prix.

Dean Stoneman won the feature race from pole position.

Classification

Qualifying

Feature Race

Sprint Race

See also 
 2014 Russian Grand Prix
 2014 Sochi GP2 Series round

References

External links
 

2014 GP3 round reports
GP3